Michael Tempo is an American drummer, percussionist and songwriter. Tempo is a prolific session musician, working with artists such as Tom Russell, Michelle Shocked, John Renbourn, Anthony Crawford, Jessica Harper, Prism, The Blazers, Marilyn Martin, Jim Matt, John "Juke" Logan, Rosie Flores, and Peter Alsop.

References

American session musicians
Living people
Year of birth missing (living people)